Acacia complanata, known as long-pod wattle and flat-stemmed wattle, is a perennial tree native to eastern Australia.

Description
It has glabrous, flexuose, flattened and narrowly winged branchlets. Like most species of Acacia it has phyllodes rather than trues leaves. They have seven to nine prominent main nerves. The inflorescences occur in groups of four to eight and are found in the axils. The thinly coriaceous-crustaceous seed pods that form after flowering have a linear shape and are rounded over the seeds.

It is not listed as being a threatened species.  It is commonly used in environmental management.

Taxonomy
The species was first formally described by the botanist George Bentham in 1842 as a part of William Jackson Hooker's work Notes on Mimoseae, with a synopsis of species as published in the London Journal of Botany. It was reclassified as Racosperma complanatum in 1987 by Leslie Pedley then transferred back to the genus Acacia in 2006.
The specific epithet is taken from the Latin word complano meaning flattened in reference to the shape of the stems.
The only listed variety is Acacia complanata var. fasciculata.

Distribution
The shrub is widely distributed throughout south-eastern Queensland from around Jericho in the west to around Bundaberg in the east and is also found as far south west as the Dumaresq River in New South Wales and down the north coast to around Coffs Harbour, New South Wales where it is situated on low ridges growing in gravelly, sandy to loamy soils often over sandstone usually as a part of heathland or dry sclerophyll forest communities. It is usually a part of the understorey in forests dominated by Eucalyptus racemosa or Corymbia citriodora.

See also
 List of Acacia species

References 

 

complanata
Trees of Australia
Fabales of Australia
Flora of New South Wales
Flora of Queensland
Plants described in 1842
Taxa named by Allan Cunningham (botanist)
Taxa named by George Bentham